The 1919 Giro d'Italia was the seventh edition of the Giro d'Italia, a Grand Tour organized and sponsored by the newspaper La Gazzetta dello Sport. The race was won by the Italian rider Costante Girardengo of the Stucchi team. Second and third respectively were Italian Gaetano Belloni and Belgian Marcel Buysse.

Of 66 riders starting the race, only 15 completed it. The Giro (the first one after the Great War) had the first to stages arriving in the "unredeemed" cities of Trento and Trieste, and was literally dominated by Girardengo, who won seven stages. The '"eternal second" Gaetano Belloni won his first stage in the Giro.

This edition of the race was also characterised by the first stage victory by a Swiss rider and by the first non-Italian cyclist on the final podium: the Belgian Marcel Buysse.

Participants

Of the 63 riders that began the Giro d'Italia on 21 May, fifteen of them made it to the finish in Milan on 8 June. Riders were allowed to ride on their own or as a member of a team. There were four teams that competed in the race: Bianchi Pirelli, Legnano-Pirelli, Peugeot-Tedeschi, and Stucchi-Dunlop. The isolati riders that participated in the race were primarily war veterans. Organizers promised all isolati riders at least 180 lire if they reached Milan. The Milan Army Corps carried participants luggage for the race with an Fiat 18 BL lorry that remained after the war.

The peloton was almost completely composed of Italians. The field featured two former Giro d'Italia champions in the three-time winner Carlo Galetti and Eberardo Pavesi who was a member of the 1912 Atala winning team. Other notable Italian riders that started the race included Costante Girardengo, Angelo Gremo, Ezio Corlaita, and Giuseppe Santhià. Girardengo was current Italian men's road race champion and was recovering from the Spanish flu.

Final standings

Stage results

General classification

There were fifteen cyclists who had completed all ten stages. For these cyclists, the times they had needed in each stage was added up for the general classification. The cyclist with the least accumulated time was the winner. Giosuè Lombardi won the prize for best ranked independent rider in the general classification.

Points classification

There was a points based classification for the race.

References

Notes

Citations

 
Giro d'Italia by year
Giro Ditalia, 1919
Giro Ditalia, 1919
Giro d'Italia
Giro d'Italia